Kyzyl-Jol is a village in Batken Region of Kyrgyzstan. Administratively, it is part of the city of Batken. Its population was 6,378 in 2021.

Population

References

Populated places in Batken Region